Nathaniel Lamson Howard (1884-1949) was an American railroad executive. He graduated from the United States Military Academy and for his meritorious service commanding military railroad engineers during World War I, he was awarded the Légion d'honneur. Upon his return, he worked as an official for the Chicago, Burlington and Quincy Railroad and the Chicago Union Station Company before being elected to the presidency of the Chicago Great Western Railway in 1925.

Notes
  Chicago Daily Tribune May 8, 1949.

1884 births
1949 deaths
20th-century American railroad executives
Chicago Great Western Railway presidents
People from Fairfield, Iowa